Kjell Ove Hauge (born 20 February 1969) is a retired Norwegian shot putter and discus thrower, turned educator, later Head teacher. As an athlete he represented Gloppen Athletics club. Since July 2013 Hauge is Principal at Kuben Upper Secondary School, the largest Upper Secondary School in Oslo.

Biography 
Hauge was born in the town of Sandane at the west coast of Norway. He graduated from Firda Upper Secondary High School in 1988 and studied after this, physical scienceat Sogn og Fjordane University College. From 1989 he did his conscription. From the fall of 1990 he was offered a scholarship from University of Texas at El Paso, got an early discharge from the military and entered the UTEP Miners Track and Field program. He got his Bachelor of Science in kinesiology at UTEP.

After his athletic career he worked as a sports teacher at Bjerke Upper Secondary School in Oslo. He graduated Master for management fra BI Norwegian Business School in 2009 and got the position of director of school development at the same school. From 2010 her was manager for a vocational education drop-out project for the City of Oslo Education Authority. In July 2013 he became Principal at Oslos largest secondary school, Kuben Upper Secondary School.

Academic career 

Kuben Upper Secondary School in 2013 the school is the city of Oslo investment in Vocational education. Hauge took over the brand new school in 2013, a landmark in the burrow of Bjerke, and is responsible for 1850 students and 300 employees. Under Hauges management the school has become one of the mort applied schools in Oslo.

In 2017 Kuben received The European Quality Label for its skolens dropout prevention work. Kuben then was awarded the Benjamin Prize of 2018 for systematic work aganist rasism and dicrimination.

Entrepreneurial work is established as a central part of the schools teaching and in 2022 Kuben won JA Europe The Entrepreneurial School Awards 2022

Athletic career 
 
He finished eleventh at the 1997 IAAF World Indoor Championships. In addition he competed at the 1994 European Championships and the 1997 World Championships without reaching the final round. He became Norwegian shot put champion in 1993, 1994, 1996 and 1997

In 1994 Hauge finished runner up at the NCAA championships at Boise, Idaho, passing the  limit for the first time with 20.07 m.

Hauge enrolled at UTEP in 1990 and first worked with throws coach Steve Lemke, and from the fall of 1993, Robert Parker. Parker stayed on as Hauges coach throughout his career.

His personal best in shot put, achieved in May 1998 in Eugene. This ranks him sixth all time among Norwegian shot putters, behind Lars Arvid Nilsen, Marcus Thomsen, Georg Andersen, Jan Sagedal and Knut Hjeltnes.

In June 1998 Hauge tested positive for the anabolic steroid Metandienone. He admitted to having used the substance in an attempt to repair a career endring injury, and retired.

Major competitions

See also
List of sportspeople sanctioned for doping offences
People with surname Hauge

References

External pages 
 IAAF profile

1969 births
Living people
Heads of schools in Norway
Norwegian male discus throwers
Norwegian male shot putters
Norwegian athletics coaches
Norwegian sports coaches
Norwegian schoolteachers
21st-century Norwegian educators
Doping cases in athletics
Norwegian sportspeople in doping cases
Western Norway University of Applied Sciences alumni
BI Norwegian Business School alumni
University of Texas at El Paso alumni
UTEP Miners men's track and field athletes
People from Gloppen
Sportspeople from Vestland